Albert Toney (March 3, 1879 – October 26, 1931) was an American baseball shortstop in the pre-Negro leagues. He played most seasons for Chicago teams such as Chicago Union Giants, Leland Giants, and Chicago Giants.

Toney played with many popular players of the day, including Rube Foster, Dangerfield Talbert, Henry W. Moore, Chappie Johnson, William Binga, Walter Ball.

References

External links

1879 births
1931 deaths
Algona Brownies players
Chicago American Giants players
French Lick Plutos players
Leland Giants players
People from Du Quoin, Illinois
20th-century African-American people
Kansas City Royal Giants players